Felton T. "Pooch" Wright (August 20, 1900 – May 25, 1971) was an American football coach.  He was the sixth head football coach at  Howard Payne University in Brownwood, Texas, serving for three seasons, from 1948 to 1950, and compiling a record of 15–15–1. He had a son, Robert Felton Wright.

Head coaching record

References

External links
 

1900 births
1971 deaths
American football tackles
Howard Payne Yellow Jackets athletic directors
Howard Payne Yellow Jackets football coaches
Howard Payne Yellow Jackets football players
People from Junction, Texas
Players of American football from Texas